Güven Önüt (1940 24 February 2003) was a Turkish international footballer. A forward during his playing days, Önüt finished top scorer of the 1963–64 1.Lig with 19 goals. He most notably played for Beşiktaş from 1960 to 1969, scoring 62 goals in 133 matches for the club. The club transferred him from İzmirspor in 1960 after he scored a hat-trick against them, beating out Fenerbahçe and Galatasaray for his signature. He also played Trabzonspor and Orduspor. Önüt died on 24 February 2003 after suffering a heart attack. He was interred in Kazlıçeşme, Zeytinburnu.

Honours

Beşiktaş
Süper Lig: 1965–66, 1966–67

Individual
Süper Lig top scorers: 1963-64
Beşiktaş J.K. Squads of Century (Bronze Team)

References

1940 births
Turkish footballers
Turkey international footballers
Turkey youth international footballers
Süper Lig players
Aydınspor footballers
İzmirspor footballers
Beşiktaş J.K. footballers
Trabzonspor footballers
Orduspor footballers
2003 deaths
Association football forwards
People from Aydın